Mohamed Rahmoune (1940 – 4 February 2022), commonly known as Si Rabah or simply as Rahmoune, was a prominent revolutionary leader during the Algerian war of independence as a member of the Front de Libération Nationale (FLN; National Liberation Front) that launched an armed revolt throughout Algeria and issued a proclamation calling for a sovereign Algerian state.

Education 

Rahmoune was born in 1940 in the village of Soumâa, located 53 km east of the city of Algiers, into a kabyle maraboutic family descended from the maliki and sufi theologian Sidi Boushaki (1394-1453).

His birth in the middle of the Second World War meant the abolition of civil life in French Algeria and the establishment of the state of exception with the suspension of the participation of his uncle Mohamed Seghir Boushaki (1869-1959) in the cogwheels of the colonial administration as adviser and representative of the Algerian natives.

Despite this extraordinary situation, he began in 1945 to study with his brother Djilali the precepts of the Quran and the Arabic language in the Zawiyet Sidi Boushaki like his other cousins, under the patronage and supervision of the Rahmaniyya mufti and muqaddam Ali Boushaki (1855-1965) with the other imams and teachers as the theologian Brahim Boushaki (1912-1997).

The massacres of May 1945, for their part, had finally sealed the conviction of the Algerian mountain and rural population that the participatory procedure in local elections could not take away the civil and political rights claimed since the 1920 elections in Algeria, and this is so since Mohamed Rahmoune was integrated from a very young age in a course that only saw independence torn by the weapons in the hands of his generation.

Among his closest cousins who inspired him in Soumâa with nationalist and independence fervor is his cousin Yahia Boushaki (1935-1960) who sponsored and supported him since 1951 to prepare him for the tough and decisive tasks of insurrectionary action against the French army.

War of Independence 

Since the outbreak of the Algerian revolution when he was only 14 years old, he was well prepared politically and physically to join the maquis and comfort the Algerian warriors against the enemy troops in order to definitively dislodge the French colonial system from the land of Algeria.

But after the organization of the Soummam conference on August 20, 1956, and the revolutionary structuring of the Algerian territory, the armed action was entrusted to Mohamed's congeners over 16 years of age to ignite the insurrection to perpetuate it by attacking the colony's interests in cities, such as Thénia (formerly Ménerville) which was only 3 km north of his village of Soumâa.

Thus, he participated, together with his cousin Bouzid Boushaki, in planting a bomb in the post office in the center of Thénia in 1956, as well as various sabotage actions in the colonial agricultural estates around this strategic railway city.

After his brother Djilali Rahmoune died as a martyr (shahid) in the field of honor in 1957, he joined the ranks of the National Liberation Army (ALN) in the third district, the first region, in the fourth historical wilaya, where he participated in many battles.

Prison 

After participating in a 1957 military ambush against French soldiers near the town of Beni Amrane, Mujahid Rahmoune was captured with some surviving soldiers to be taken to the Ferme Gauthier torture and physical abuse camp in the north of the town of Souk El-Had.

He was then tortured with electric shocks and brutal traumas while he was buried with his cousin Bouzid Boushaki in the pits of the vats of this wine estate that was transformed by the torturers Scarfo and Mathieu among others into a concentration camp and extrajudicial killing.

While many detainees in this sinister place of torture succumbed to the pain and abuse they suffered, and their bodies and remains were hidden in wells or thrown into the waters of the Isser River, Rahmoune was transferred after a few weeks of torture to the Serkadji Prison in the Casbah of Algiers with the local leaders of the revolution to stand trial.

Escape 

Rahmoune managed to escape from Boghar prison in 1959 with four mujahideen acolytes, and this after recovering from the aftermath of the 1957 battle and the various phases of torture he suffered.

After having crossed the Chahbounia ravines with his friends, he was picked up by the soldiers of the Algerian Revolutionary Army (ALN) who took him to the headquarters of the fourth historical wilaya to meet Colonel M'Hamed Bougarra (1928-1959) who appointed Rahmoune as military secretary in the first region of this historic wilaya.

He then asked the revolutionary command to post him to the Sour El Ghozlane (former Aumale) region that he knew well and in which he had strong revolutionary ties, and there he continued his subversive action against French settlers and soldiers.

While traveling in 1960 to Mount Dirrah overlooking Sour El Ghozlane to carry out one of the military operations he was orchestrating, he was exposed to direct confrontation with enemy French forces, during which he was seriously injured in the knee.

This restrictive injury made it difficult for him to move in the maquis, which made it easier for the French soldiers to arrest him again and transfer him to the torture center (the second office) in Sour El Ghozlane. Rahmoune was re-arrested at Boghar Prison, and immediately spent 7 months in the CMS prison where he was repeatedly tortured by French soldiers. He remained in custody at the CMS until February 23, 1962, a few weeks before the ceasefire on March 19 on the eve of independence after the Évian Accords have been concluded.

Death 

Moudjahid Rahmoune died on February 4, 2022, at the home of his family in Thénia at the age of 82.

He was buried the following day at the Djebanat El Ghorba Cemetery in southern Thénia on the outskirts of the village of Soumâa in front of his family and friends and a delegation from the Algerian government.

See also 

 Algerian nationalism
 Algerian War of Independence
 National Liberation Front (Algeria)
 National Liberation Army (Algeria)
 List of Algerians

References

External links 
 Official website of the Ministry of Mujahideen in Algeria.
 Official website of the National Organization of Mujahideen in Algeria.

1940 births
2022 deaths
People from Thénia
People from Thénia District
People from Boumerdès Province
Algerian people
Kabyle people
Rahmoune family
Deaths in Algeria
Zawiyet Sidi Boushaki alumni
Algerian revolutionaries
Indigenous activists of Africa
People of the Algerian War
Algerian torture victims
Members of the National Liberation Front (Algeria)
Algerian military personnel
Members of the National Liberation Army (Algeria)
Algerian resistance leaders
National Heroes of Algeria
Algerian political people
Arab politicians
National Liberation Front (Algeria) politicians
Burials in Algeria